van Voorst tot Voorst is an old Dutch noble family from the Dutch province of Overijssel.

History
The family has been noble since at least the 14th century ("Uradel"). The first documented ancestor is Fredericus van Hekeren van der Ese (in 1327). His son Frederik van Heeckeren van der Eze (1320-ca. 1386) was the head of the Heeckerens faction during the War of the Guelderian Succession. Through his marriage with Lutgardis van Voorst, whose ancestors owned both the castle Rechteren near Dalfsen as well as the castle Voorst near Zwolle, the surname van Voorst entered the family. In 1432, Frederik's grandson, Frederik van Hekeren genaamd van Rechteren († 1462), married Cunegonde van Polanen. Their son, Zeger van Hekeren genaamd van Voorst, became the ancestor of the present-day family van Voorst tot Voorst. Zeger's brother, Otto van Hekeren genaamd van Rechteren († 1478), became the ancestor of the counts of van Rechteren.
 
During the nineteenth and twentieth century, the family produced several high-ranking officers of the Dutch army, Commissioners of the Queen, diplomats and members of the House of Representatives and Senate. Members carry the title of baron.

One branch belongs to the  Belgian nobility: the children from the second marriage of Franciscus baron van Voorst tot Voorst (1884-1955) with jkvr.  (Belgian: viscountess ) Antoinette van Aefferden (1895-1976) were incorporated into the Belgian Nobility based on the Royal decree of 1814.

Notable members of the family
 Jan Joseph Godfried van Voorst tot Voorst (1846 – 1931), Dutch politician
 Jan Joseph Godfried van Voorst tot Voorst (1880 – 1963), son of the above, officer of the Dutch armed forces
 Franciscus van Voorst tot Voorst
 Eduardus van Voorst tot Voorst (1874 – 1945), Dutch sport shooter
 Berend-Jan van Voorst tot Voorst (born 1944), retired Dutch politician and diplomat
 Herman van Voorst tot Voorst (1886 - 1971), Dutch Army officer and politician

Coat of arms
The coat of arms consists of three red chevrons on a field of gold. This coat of arms is depicted in the medieval Gelre Armorial (folio 88v and 101v).

Gallery

Literature
 A.F.H. van Heeckeren, 'Genealogie van de geslachten Van Voorst, Van Heeckeren, Van Rechteren' in: Heraldieke Bibliotheek (1876).
 E.L. van Voorst tot Voorst, 'Het Boek der Voorsten: Het geslacht van Voorst tot Voorst, uit officieele bronnen toegelicht' ('s-Gravehage, 1892).
 J.J. Hooft van Huysduynen, 'Bijdrage tot een genealogie van het geslacht Van Voorst tot Voorst' ('s-Gravenhage, 1968).
 J.G.N. Renaud et al., 'Het kasteel Voorst- Macht en val van een Overijsselse burcht' (Zwolle, 1983).
 * Mensema, A.J., Raat, R.M. de, Woude, C.C. van der, Inventaris van het huisarchief Almelo, 3 volumes, 1236 - 1917 (1933), Zwolle (1993). online version including family tree of early generations of the Van der Eze, Van Heeckeren, Van Rechteren en Van Voorst family.
 Nederland's Adelsboek 96 (2011), p. 263-357.
 Etat présent de la noblesse belge (2014), p. 282-284.
 Detlev Schwennicke, Europäische Stammtafeln Band XXVII (2012) Tafel 94–95.

References

See also
Voorst, a present-day municipality in  Gelderland. In 1362, the castle Voorst was besieged by Prince-Bishop John of Arkel.

Surnames
Dutch noble families
Barons of the Netherlands
Barons of Belgium
Belgian noble families
Dutch-language surnames
Dutch toponymic surnames